Crambus vulcanus is a moth in the family Crambidae. It was described by Graziano Bassi in 2000. It is found in the Democratic Republic of the Congo.

References

Crambini
Moths described in 2000
Moths of Africa